James McPherson (1831/1832 – 23 August 1905) was a 19th-century Member of Parliament in the Waikato region of New Zealand.

He arrived in New Zealand on the Calcutta in May 1861 as Ensign of the 70th Regiment with his wife and two children. Later, he was paymaster in the Commissariat Transport Corps. In July 1864, he received his commission as captain and joined the 4th Waikato Regiment.

His country grant was in the present-day suburb of Hillcrest, Hamilton, and as well as farming the land he set up a flax-dressing mill. He named his property 'Riverlea' and built a two storied house of Kauri timber in the mid 1870s.

Six years later he was with the Waikato County Council (appointed clerk and treasurer) and remained there until his death on 22 August 1905. He is buried in the Hamilton East Cemetery.

References

Members of the New Zealand House of Representatives
1830s births
1905 deaths
Scottish emigrants to New Zealand
New Zealand MPs for North Island electorates
Burials at Hamilton East Cemetery
19th-century New Zealand politicians